Wisznia (Vishnya, Ви́шня, in Ukrainian) is a right tributary of the San River in southeastern Poland.

Description
Just south of Rudky, Ukraine, near the village of Novosilky-Hostynni, the river reverses flow, with the southern extremity flowing into the Dniester.

The river falls into San near the city of Radymno.

Tributaries
Left
 Vyshenka
 Sichnia
 Troshchanka (left)
Shum (left)
 Sikonytsia (right)
Chyzhivka (left)

Right
 Rakiv
 Zamlynka (left)
 Hlynets (right)
 Khorosnytsia
 Huchok (right)
 Chornyi Potik (Black Stream)

See also
 Rivers of Poland
 Walddeutsche

Rivers of Poland
Rivers of Podkarpackie Voivodeship
Rivers of Lviv Oblast